The Troitskaya line (Line 16, previously Kommunarskaya line) is an under-construction line of the Moscow Metro that will initially extend to the settlement of Kommunarka in the Novomoskovsky Administrative Okrug, or New Moscow from Novatorskaya station. Future expansion plans will extend the line to the town of Troitsk. The city is constructing the line with a planned opening in 2023–2024.

Current timeline
The initial stage of the line will cover  from Moscow to Kommunarka and have seven stations. The city projects completion in 2023-2024 at a cost of 49.8 billion rubles.

Development
Following the expansion of the city of Moscow, which doubled the city’s size, the city administration sought to increase public transit into the area, known as New Moscow. In 2014, the Mayor of Moscow, Sergey Sobyanin, undertook a visit to China where he signed an agreement with the China Railway Construction Corporation (CRCC) and China International Fund to build a line to New Moscow and finance construction by developing real estate at the stations. With the fall of the ruble in late 2014, negotiations over costs were held up and the Deputy Mayor for Construction Marat Khusnullin announced that the city would continue development using its own funds.

By 2016, the city was again negotiating with CRCC for construction of the line. Rather than CRCC handing the whole project, the city wanted to split the work between Russian and Chinese workers. The parties agreed not only on construction of the Troistkaya line, but also three stations of the Bolshaya Koltsevaya line: Michurinsky Prospekt, Aminyevskaya, and Prospekt Vernadskogo.

On 19 June 2019, construction began on the Universitet Druzhby Narodov station, and on 17 July it was announced that construction work at various stages was already underway at all stations of the first section.

On 26 August 2019 Sergei Sobyanin officially announced the extension of line 16 to the south from Kommunarka to Troitsk. According to him,
Part of the section from Sosenki to Desna will be at-ground.

On 25 November 2019 the construction of the first tunnel of the line between "Ulitsa Novatorov" and "Universitet Druzhby Narodov" began.

Stations

Opening 2018-2024 Building Line 16
Line 16 >>> Line 15

References

External links 
 Moscow Complex for Construction and Urban Development
 Moscow Metro Official Website

Moscow Metro lines